Ulu Titi Basah is the southernmost high peak of Thailand. This 1,533 m high peak is located on the Malaysia-Thailand border between Betong District of Yala Province and Hulu Perak in the state of Perak.

Geography
Ulu Titi Basah is the highest summit of the Sankalakhiri Range, the northern section of the Titiwangsa Mountains, a sub-range of the Tenasserim Hills.

See also
List of mountains in Thailand
Temenggor Lake

References

External links
 Gunong Ulu Titi Basah, Thailand
Damrong (in Thai)

Titiwangsa Mountains
Hulu Perak District
Mountains of Thailand
Mountains of Perak
Geography of Yala province
Malaysia–Thailand border